Breuer is a surname. Notable people with the surname include:

 Amit Breuer, Canadian-Israeli documentary filmmaker
 Annabel Breuer (born 1992), German wheelchair fencer and wheelchair basketball player
 Bessie Breuer (1893–1975), American journalist and author
 Beverley Breuer, American actress
 Carolyn Breuer (born 1969), German musician
 Eric Breuer, Swiss archaeologist and historian
 Grit Breuer (born 1972), German sprinter
 Hans Breuer (physicist) (born 1933), German physicist
 Hans Breuer (politician), German politician
 Isaac Breuer (1883–1946), German rabbi
 Jacob Breuer (born 1916), Israeli lawyer
 Jacques Breuer (born 1956), Austrian actor
 Jean Breuer (born 1951), German cyclist
 Jean Breuer (cyclist, born 1919) (1919–1986), Belgian cyclist
 Jim Breuer (born 1967), American comedian
 Josef Breuer (1842–1925), Austrian physician and physiologist
 Joseph Breuer (1882–1980), Hungarian-born German and American rabbi
 Lanny A. Breuer (born 1958), American lawyer
 Lee Breuer (born 1937), American playwright and theatre director
 Lyn Breuer (born 1951), Australian politician
 Mala Breuer (1927–2017), American artist
 Marcel Breuer (1902–1981), Hungarian-born American architect and furniture designer
 Marco Breuer (born 1966), German photographer
 Marita Breuer (born 1953), German actress
 Marv Breuer (1914–1991), American baseball player
 Michel Breuer (born 1980), Dutch footballer
 Miles J. Breuer (1889–1945), science fiction writer and physician
 Mordechai Breuer (1921–2007), German-born Israeli Orthodox rabbi
 Mordechai Breuer (historian) (1918–2007), German-Jewish historian
 Peter Breuer (1856–1930), German sculptor
 Randy Breuer (born 1960), American basketball player
 Renate Breuer (born 1939), West German sprint canoeist
 Shayne Breuer (born 1972), Australian rules footballer
 Siegfried Breuer (1906–1954), Austrian actor
 Siegfried Breuer Jr. (1930–2004), Austrian actor
 Solomon Breuer (1850–1926), Hungarian-born German rabbi
 Theo Breuer (born 1956), German poet, essayist, editor, translator and publisher
 Theo Breuer (footballer) (1909–1980), German footballer
 Thomas C. Breuer (born 1952), German writer and cabaret artist
 William Breuer (1922–2010), American military historian
 David Breuer-Weil (born 1965), English artist
 Ursula Merkin (1919–2006), German-born American philanthropist, born Ursula Breuer

See also
 Beurer, German manufacturer 
 Brewer (surname)
 Meike Breuer, fictional character in the German soap opera Verbotene Liebe
 Met Breuer, defunct museum in New York City
 Khal Adath Jeshurun, Orthodox German Jewish Ashkenazi congregation in New York City, colloquially known as Breuer's

German-language surnames
Jewish surnames
Occupational surnames